Awashi is a small village in Ratnagiri district, Maharashtra state in Western India. The 2011 Census of India recorded a total of 509 residents in the village. Awashi is approximately 1,200 km away in a southwestern direction from India's capital New Delhi.

See also
 Awashi Dam

References

Villages in Ratnagiri district